Mahesh Bhupathi and Mark Knowles were the defending champions, although they are not participating this year. However Knowles is appearing with Mardy Fish.

Seeds

Draw

External links
Draw

Doubles